The Very Best is a greatest hits album released by Australian band INXS in 2011. It initially peaked at number 39.

Following the screening of INXS: Never Tear Us Apart, an Australian miniseries about INXS that commenced on 9 February 2014 on the Seven Network, the album re-entered the charts, peaking at number one. When the miniseries screened in New Zealand in August 2014, the album also charted, similarly peaking at number one.

Track listing
The album was released in three formats; a single-disc version, a double-disc version and a double-disc version with a DVD. The first disc of the Deluxe Edition is the same as the Standard Edition.

Chart performance
The Very Best debuted and peaked at number 39 in Australia on 6 November 2011. When promotion began for the mini-series, it re-entered the charts at number 13 on 10 November 2013. With the airing on the mini-series in February 2014, the album slowly rose to number-one on 17 February 2014. It became the first INXS "best of" album to reach number-one in Australia.

The Very Best took 77 weeks before it reached number-one and holds the record for the longest number of weeks to rise to number-one, in ARIA chart history.

Charts and certifications

Weekly charts

Year-end charts

The Very Best was the highest selling album in Australia by an Australian artist in 2014 and the fourth overall.

Decade-end charts

Certifications

See also
 List of number-one albums of 2014 (Australia)

References

2011 greatest hits albums
INXS compilation albums
Atlantic Records compilation albums
Rhino Records compilation albums
Universal Music Group compilation albums